National Highway 28A (NH 28A) is an east–west National highway in India that starts from Ambikapur and terminates in Siddharth Nagar. The highway passes through the states of Madhya Pradesh, Uttar Pradesh, and Bihar.
NH-28A was laid and is maintained by the Central Public Works Department (CPWD). This is the second longest National Highway in India after NH-27 and is a part of the NS-EW Corridor of NHAI.

Condition 
According to the locals, NH 28A has been in a terrible condition for the past 25 years. There has been minimal to no efforts to repair the highway. However every time the local government claims to repair it during the elections, the situation remains bad. Due to this the connectivity to Nepal is effected on an everyday basis. This effects the tourism and business as well.

Route

 Barhni
 Itwa
 Bansi
 Karmini
 Bakhira
 Baghuli
 Khalilabad
 Vishwanathapur
 Nath Nagar
 Mukhilspur
 Dhan Ghata
 Umariya Bazar
 Bidhar Ghat
 Madar Mau
 Jahangirganj
 Rajesultanpur
 Mahrajganj
 Ismailpur Goriya
 Jaigahan
 Baithauli Azm
 Sathiaon
 Jahanaganj
 Chiraiyakot
 Saidpur
 Chahaniya
 Sakaldiha
 Chandauli
 Gorakhi
 Sikenderpur
 Chakia
 Naugarh
 Madhupur
 Robertsganj
 Renukoot
 Babhni
 Ambikapur

See also
 List of National Highways in India (by Highway Number)
 National Highways Development Project

References 

233B
National highways in India (old numbering)
Rajesultanpur